So Loi Keung (born 27 October 1982 in Hong Kong) is a former professional football player and current player-coach for Hong Kong First Division club Wong Tai Sin. He played as a left midfielder and a left back.

Career
He previously played for Fukien AC, Rangers and Tai Po.

Tai Po
During his Tai Po career, he helped the team beat Pegasus 4:2 to win the 2008–09 Hong Kong FA Cup, thus Tai Po earned the right to play in the 2010 AFC Cup.

Kitchee
On 26 May 2010, Kitchee announced that So Loi Keung has joined the team for the 2010–11 Hong Kong First Division League. He wore no. 8 at Kitchee and scored 3 goals for the club.

Citizen

On 16 June 2011, Citizen announced that they have signed So Loi Keung for the 2011–12 Hong Kong First Division League season and the 2012 AFC Cup. He cited a lack of playing time at Kitchee as the reason for the move. He hopes to share his AFC Cup experience with the team. He will continue to wear the no. 8 shirt at his new club.

So Loi Keung is reunited with former teammate Chiu Chun Kit at Citizen and both have been recruited to be coaches at the Hong Kong Arsenal Soccer School.

International career
So Loi Keung was selected to represent Hong Kong in the 2011 AFC Asian Cup qualification match away to Bahrain. Hong Kong lost 4:0. He started and finished the match. On 16 June 2011, So Loi Keung was named as one of the 25-men Hong Kong squad to face Saudi Arabia in the 2014 FIFA World Cup Asian qualification match. On 30 September 2011, So Loi Keung was sent off in the 3:3 draw with the Philippines in the 2011 Long Teng Cup.

References

External links
So Loi Keung at HKFA

1982 births
Living people
Association football midfielders
Hong Kong footballers
Hong Kong Rangers FC players
Tai Po FC players
Kitchee SC players
Citizen AA players
Yuen Long FC players
Hong Kong Sapling players
Hong Kong First Division League players
Hong Kong Premier League players
Hong Kong international footballers